Simon Rosenbaum may refer to:

Simon Rosenbaum (baseball) (born 1993), American-Israeli baseball first baseman
Simon Rosenbaum (minister) (1860–1934), Jewish politician in the Russian Empire and Lithuania
Simon Rosenbaum (statistician) (1877–?), British statistician